The 1981 Uganda National League was the 14th season of the Ugandan football championship, the top-level football league of Uganda.

Overview
The 1981 Uganda National League was contested by 17 teams and was won by Kampala City Council FC, while Coffee Kakira, NIC, Lint Marketing Board, Nsambya Old Timers, Mbale Heroes, Wandegeya FC and AT Millers were relegated.

League standings

Leading goalscorer
The top goalscorer in the 1981 season was Issa Ssekatawa of Nytil FC with 18 goals.

References

External links
Uganda - List of Champions - RSSSF (Hans Schöggl)
Ugandan Football League Tables - League321.com

Ugandan Super League seasons
Uganda
Uganda
1